Joseph Robson Tanner (28 July 1860 – 15 January 1931) was an English historian, an expert on Samuel Pepys, author of numerous publications and Fellow of St John's College, Cambridge.

Life
Tanner was born in Frome, Somerset, the eldest son of Joseph Tanner. He was educated at Mill Hill School, London, and at St John's College, Cambridge, where he took a First in the Historical Tripos in 1882. He was President of the Cambridge Union Society in Easter Term, 1883. He was a lecturer in History at St John's, from 1883 to 1921, and lecturer on Indian History to Indian Civil Service students, from 1885 to 1893.
 
In 1883 Tanner became a Fellow of St John's and was an Assistant Tutor from 1895 to 1900, a Tutor from 1900 to 1912, and Tutorial Bursar, 1900–21. He served as a deputy to the Regius Professor of Modern History, 1926–27.

In 1888 Tanner married Charlotte Maria, second daughter of George J. Larkman of Belton. After living in Cambridge for forty-two years he moved to Woodside, Aldeburgh, Suffolk. He is buried at the Parish of the Ascension Burial Ground in Cambridge.

Select publications
Hollond's Discourses of the Navy, 1896
Pepys' Memoirs of the Royal Navy, ed., 1906
An Historical Register of the University of Cambridge, 1917
Samuel Pepys and the Royal Navy [Lees Knowles Lectures, 1919], 1920
Tudor Constitutional Documents, 1485–1603, 1922
Mr Pepys, An Introduction to the Diary, 1925
Pepy's Naval Minutes, 1926
Private Correspondence of Samuel Pepys, 1679–1703, 1926
English Constitutional Conflicts, 1603–1689, 1928
Further Correspondence of Samuel Pepys, 1662–1679, 1929
Constitutional Documents of the Reign of James I, 1930

References

External links
 

1860 births
1931 deaths
Fellows of St John's College, Cambridge
Alumni of St John's College, Cambridge
People educated at Mill Hill School
Presidents of the Cambridge Union
19th-century English historians
English male non-fiction writers
20th-century English historians